"Her Charity" is the fourth single by Australian band Boom Crash Opera, released in 1987. It was the fourth single to be released from the band's self-title album. It peaked at number 32 on the Kent Music Report. The song is about Miss America Beauty pageants.

Track listing 
 "Her Charity" (Peter Farnan, Richard Pleasance) – 4:58
 "The Face That I'm Living In" (Dale Ryder, Greg O'Connor, Peter Maslen) – 2:52
 "Her Charity" (Dance Mix) (Farnan, Pleasance) – 6:46

Personnel 
 Peter Maslen – drums, vocals
 Greg O'Connor – keyboards
 Dale Ryder – lead vocals
 Richard Pleasance – guitar, bass, vocals
 Peter Farnan – guitar, vocals
Production 
 Engineer – Will Gosling (tracks: 1 & 2)
 Producer – Alex Sadkin (tracks: 1 & 2)
 Remix – Phil Thornalley (tracks: 3)
 Producer – Peter Farnan, Richard Pleasance (tracks: 3)

Charts

Weekly charts

References 

Boom Crash Opera songs
1987 singles
1987 songs
Warner Music Group singles
Songs written by Richard Pleasance